Gottschalk Eduard Guhrauer (15 May 1809 – 5 January 1854) was a German philologist and biographer. He is known principally for his 1842 biography of Gottfried Wilhelm Leibniz and his completion (1853) of Theodor Wilhelm Danzel's biography of Lessing, G. E. Lessing, sein Leben und seine Werke (1850–53, 2 volumes).

He was born at Bojanowo (then in Grand Duchy of Warsaw, now in Poland) and died at Breslau (now Wrocław, Poland).

He studied philology and philosophy at Breslau and Berlin, later spending time in Paris, where he researched Leibniz' works. After his return to Germany, he worked as a librarian at the University of Breslau. In 1843, he became a professor at Breslau. He wrote also on Jean Bodin, Joachim Jungius and Kurmainz (Electorate of Mainz).

Literary works 
 Mémoire sur le Projet de Leibnitz Relatif à l'Expedition d'Egypte Proposé à Louis XIV en 1672, Paris, 1839.
 Kur-Mainz in der Epoche von 1672, Hamburg, 1839 - Kurmainz in the era of 1672.
 Lessings Erziehung des Menschengeschlechts, Kritisch und Philosophisch Erörtert ib. 1841 - Lessing's Education of Mankind, critically and philosophically explained.
 Das Heptaplomeres des Jean Bodin, ib. 1841 - The heptaplomeres of Jean Bodin.
 G. W. v. Leibniz, eine Biographie, Breslau, 1842, supplement 1846. - Leibniz, a biography.
 Joachim Jungius und Sein Zeitalter, Stuttgart, 1850. - Jungius and his era.
Also, he edited Leibniz's Deutsche Schriften (2 volumes: 1838–40), and Goethe's Briefwechsel mit Knebel (Goethe's correspondence with Karl Ludwig von Knebel, 1851).

References 
 ADB: Guhrauer, Edward Gottschalk Allgemeine Deutsche Biographie.

1809 births
1854 deaths
People from Rawicz County
German philologists
German biographers
Male biographers
People from the Grand Duchy of Posen
Academic staff of the University of Breslau
German male non-fiction writers